The Tunisia Private University (ULT) is a university in Tunis, Tunisia. It was founded in 1973 and is organized in six faculties.

Organization
These are the six faculties, schools and institute in the university:

 Faculty of Law and Economics
 Faculty of Literature, Arts and Humanities Science
 Polytechnic Institute
 School of Architecture and Design
 School of Business
 International Language School (I.L.S.)

Profile
ULT (Université Libre de Tunis) is the first private university created in Tunisia. It was officially recognized by the Tunisian government (through the Ministry of Higher Education) according to law n° 73 of 2000.

One central part of ULT is the school of Electronics and Automatics created in 1973 by M. Mohamed Boussaïri Bouebdelli. In 1992 the higher education studies were set up at ULT.

It is an accredited member of the Association of Arab Universities (AAU) and the International Association of Universities (IAU-UNESCO).

ULT is accredited by the Islamic Educational Scientific and Cultural Organisation (IESCO).

Students from over 30 countries are studying at the ULT. The university currently has 200 staff and faculty.

See also

 List of colleges and universities
 Tunis

External links
Tunisia Private University Website 
 higher education in Tunisia

Universities in Tunisia
Education in Tunis
Educational institutions established in 1973
1973 establishments in Tunisia